Hazimism, also referred to as the Hazimi movement or known as the hazimiyyah or Hazimi current, is an extremist strand of Wahhabism based on the teachings of the Saudi-born Muslim scholar Ahmad ibn Umar al-Hazimi. Hazimis believe that those who do not unconditionally excommunicate (takfir) unbelievers are themselves unbelievers, which opponents argue leads to an unending chain of takfir." . Its spread within ISIS triggered prolonged ideological conflict within the group, pitting its followers against the moderate faction led by Turki al-Binali. The movement was eventually branded as extremist by ISIS, who initiated a crackdown on its followers.

Beliefs 
Contemporary Salafi-Jihadi movements base their beliefs on the teachings of theologians such as Ibn Taymiyyah and Muhammad ibn Abd al-Wahhab. However, al-Hazimi asserted that the doctrines put forward by contemporary Salafi-Jihadi thinkers were not to be blindly followed; challenging the consensual authority of Ibn Taymiyyah. This outlook would completely shake the ideological foundations of the Salafi-Jihadi movement. Hazimi's doctrines were also highly influenced by the doctrines of the Egyptian militant Islamist ideologue Sayyid Qutb. 

Central to Hazimism is the doctrine of takfir al-‘adhir ("excommunication of the excuser"). Wahhabi movement regards the Takfir (religious excommunication) of polytheists as a duty. As per the third "nullifier" in his treatise Nullifiers of Islam, Muhammad ibn 'Abd al-Wahhab writes that those who do not takfir polytheists are themselves, unbelievers, whether that is because they doubt their disbelief or otherwise. The crux of the dispute between Hazimis and Salafis, Wahhabis, Jihadis, ISIS, etc. was over the concept known as al-‘udhr bi’l-jahl (i.e, “excusing on the basis of ignorance") a belief which the Jihadis consider as a restraint on excessive takfir. To justify their claims, various Hazimi ideologues assert that Ibn Taymiyyah was against the principle of al-‘udhr bi’l-jahl in affairs of shirk (polytheism). Al-Hazimi categorically rejects al-‘udhr bi’l-jahl for matters he considers to be of "greater polytheism" (al-shirk al-akbar) and "greater disbelief" (al-kufr al-akbar), such as voting in elections, supplicating to the dead, etc. In these scenarios, al-Hazimi states that those who refuse to pronounce takfir by citing al-‘udhr bi’l-jahl are unbelievers as per the third nullifier. Although not affiliated to jihadists himself, al-Hazimi's views influenced a number of jihadists who went on to join the Daesh. These fringe elements within ISIS who adopted Hazimi's doctrines came to be known as “the Hazimis” (al-Hazimiyya, al-Hazimiyyun).

History

Al-Hazimi in Tunisia 
Between December 2011 and May 2012, Al-Hazimi delivered four lectures in Tunisia. He was supported by the Islamic Good Society and Hay al-Khadra’ Mosques Committee. While the members of the former were arrested for financing terrorism, the latter had maintained links to Ansar al-Sharia in Tunisia (AST). With the aid of the committee, al-Hazimi founded the Ibn Abi Zayd al-Qayrawani Institute for Sharia Sciences, which promoted his teachings. His views were also amplified through AST's Facebook page.

Hazimism in ISIS 
In the following years, several Tunisians who adopted al-Hazimi's views joined ISIS. During the group's infighting with the Al-Nusra Front, the Tunisians remained loyal and were rewarded with senior administrative and religious posts. With increasing influence, however, their belief in takfir al-‘adhir (excommunication of the excuser) became a source of concern for Daesh leadership. Bahraini scholar Turki al-Binali, who led the group's Office of Research and Studies, prepared a series of lectures and pamphlets against the doctrine. He argued that while al-‘udhr bi’l-jahl was invalid in instances of greater polytheism and disbelief, this does not necessarily mean that those who make excuses are disbelievers. In a tweet, he also described the belief as bidʻah (religious innovation). The Binalis, as they were later termed, also claimed the Hazimi view led to an "infinite regress of takfir" (al-takfir bi’l-tasalsul).

In March 2014, audio leaked of several high-level Hazimi officials; including the wāli of Hasakah, pronouncing takfir on the Taliban and Osama bin Laden. A separate leak showed takfir being made on Al-Qaeda in the Islamic Maghreb. In late 2014, 50 Hazimis fled to Turkey while 70 were imprisoned and executed by ISIS after they made takfir on elements of its leadership which did not consider Ayman al-Zawahiri to be a disbeliever. Following their arrest, a pro-Hazimi statement surfaced describing ISIS as a "kafir jahmiyyah state". Several Hazimi cells were formed afterwards; the breakup of one in Raqqa being featured in Dabiq where they were branded as kharijites. Despite the crackdown, several groups of Hazimis remained, including one led by a certain Abu Ayyub al-Tunisi and supported by the wāli (governor) of Aleppo. In 2016, Hazimis clashed with ISIS in the vicinity of Al-Bab and Jarabulus. In an account of the incident, senior Hazimi Abu Muath al-Jazairi called ISIS the "Idols' State" and Abu Bakr al-Baghdadi the "taghut" of Syria.

In a statement published in Al-Naba in April 2017, ISIS' Central Office for Overseeing the Sharia Departments banned the discussion of al-‘udhr bi’l-jahl and takfir al-‘adhir, but warned that hesitation in takfir was inexcusable. On 17 May 2017, ISIS' Delegated Committee issued a memorandum which condemned al-takfir bi’l-tasalsul but stated that takfir was from the "foundations of the religion", rebuking those who hesitate in making it and branding them as murji'ah. Shortly afterwards, al-Binali published a response to the memorandum and claimed its intent was to placate the Hazimis. On May 31, al-Binali was killed in a coalition airstrike, followed by two other scholars who supported him. The timing was seen as suspicious by the Binalis, who accused the Delegated Committee of leaking their locations. In September 2017, Abu Bakr al-Baghdadi reportedly dismissed and detained several Hazimis, reshuffling the Delegated Committee.

In 2019, Hazimi foreign fighters, including a large contingent of Tunisians, failed a two-day coup attempt against al-Baghdadi. ISIS alleged they were led by Abu Muath al-Jazairi and placed a bounty on him.

Post-ISIS 
In June 2020, it was estimated there were over 100 Hazimis in the Netherlands.

References

Sources 

 Bunzel, Cole (2019). "Ideological Infighting in the Islamic State". Perspectives on Terrorism. 13 (1): 12–21. ISSN 2334-3745.

Anti-Shi'ism
Islamic fundamentalism
Islamic extremism
Salafi Jihadism
Islamist groups